William Taylor Zenor (April 30, 1846 – June 2, 1916) was an American lawyer, jurist, and politician who served five terms as a United States representative from Indiana from 1897 to 1907.

Biography 
He was born near Corydon, Indiana and attended the common schools and the James G. May Seminary. He also studied law in New Albany, Indiana and was admitted to the bar in 1870 and commenced practice in Corydon. He moved to Leavenworth, Crawford County, Indiana in 1871 and continued the practice of law.

Zenor was the prosecuting attorney of Crawford and Harrison Counties from 1879 to 1885. He was the judge of the third judicial circuit from 1885 to 1897.

Congress 
He was elected as a Democrat to the Fifty-fifth and to the four succeeding Congresses (March 4, 1897 - March 3, 1907).

Later career and death 
He resumed the practice of law in Corydon, Indiana after leaving Congress and moved to New Albany, Indiana in 1910.

He continued the practice of law until his death there on June 2, 1916, aged 70. He was buried in Cedar Hill Cemetery, Corydon, Indiana.

References

1846 births
1916 deaths
People from Corydon, Indiana
Indiana state court judges
People from New Albany, Indiana
Democratic Party members of the United States House of Representatives from Indiana
19th-century American politicians
19th-century American judges